Tephris cyriella is a species of snout moth in the genus Tephris. It was described by Nikolay Grigoryevich Erschoff in 1874. It is found in Spain, Romania and Turkmenistan.

The wingspan is 20–23 mm.

References

Moths described in 1874
Phycitini
Moths of Europe
Moths of Asia